Michael W. Binger (born December 20, 1976 in Delray Beach, Florida) is a part-time professional poker player, based in Atherton, California. He has a brother, Nick Binger, who also has several high-profile tournament cashes.

Binger graduated from North Carolina State University before receiving a Ph.D. in theoretical physics from Stanford University in 2006. Just two months after receiving his PhD, he outlasted 8,770 players in the 2006 World Series of Poker (WSOP) $10,000 No limit Texas Hold'em Main Event, finishing third and earning $4,123,310. Binger had reached a final table earlier in that year's WSOP, finishing sixth.

Since the 2006 WSOP, Binger has finished in the money of six World Poker Tour events. At the 2007 WSOP, Binger tied Chris Ferguson, Phil Hellmuth and Humberto Brenes for second most cashes of any player in a single World Series of Poker season with eight. This included a final table appearance in Event 22 a $5,000 buy-in No limit Texas Hold'em tournament (finishing 3rd) won by James Mackey.

Binger won the 2008 WSOP Circuit Event – Lake Tahoe, $5,150 Championship, earning $181,379

As of 2019, his total live tournament winnings exceed $7,000,000, most of which ($5,167,037) have come at the WSOP.

References

External links
 CardPlayer.com profile
 Mike Binger Hendon Mob tournament results

1976 births
Living people
North Carolina State University alumni
World Series of Poker Circuit event winners
21st-century American physicists
Theoretical physicists
People from Delray Beach, Florida
People from Atherton, California